The Denver Avalanche were an American soccer team based out of Denver, Colorado that played in the Major Indoor Soccer League from 1980 to 1982.  Their home arena was McNichols Sports Arena.

History
In February 1980, the Major Indoor Soccer League awarded a franchise to Ron Maierhofer, to be named the Denver Avalanche.  The team's first three players, all signed the same day were Tony Graham, Chris Cattaneo and Adrian Brooks.  The team's first draft pick Erhardt Kapp passed on the Avalanche and signed with the New York Cosmos of the North American Soccer League instead.  The team's first game, an exhibition match, took place on November 3, 1980, a 10–4 loss to the St. Louis Steamers.  Coached by Dave Clements, the Avalanche finished the regular season out of playoff contention, but in 1982, they made the playoffs only to fall to the St. Louis Steamers in the first round.  Clements was named the 1982 MISL Coach of the Year.  The team entered Chapter 11 bankruptcy in 1983.

Year-by-year

Honors
All Star Game MVP
 1980–1981: Adrian Brooks

Coach of the Year
 1981–1982: Dave Clements

Staff
Coach: Dave Clements
Assistant Coach: Peter Duerden
Director of Player Development: Mike Ditchfield

References
The Year in American Soccer – 1981
The Year in American Soccer – 1982
Denver Avalanche roster
Page with team logo
No Money Down: How to Buy a Sports Franchise by Ron Maierhofer

Defunct indoor soccer clubs in the United States
A
Soccer clubs in Colorado
Major Indoor Soccer League (1978–1992) teams
1980 establishments in Colorado
1983 disestablishments in Colorado
Association football clubs established in 1980
Association football clubs disestablished in 1983